Linda Jeanne Furney (born September 11, 1947) was a member of the Ohio Senate from 1987 to 2002. She represented the 11th District, which encompasses all of Toledo, Ohio, and some surrounding communities. Barred by term limits in 2002, she was forced to leave office and was succeeded by Teresa Fedor.

References

External links
Profile on the Ohio Ladies Gallery website

Democratic Party Ohio state senators
1947 births
Living people
Women state legislators in Ohio
Politicians from Toledo, Ohio
21st-century American politicians
21st-century American women politicians